Baugé is a former commune in the Maine-et-Loire department in western France.

Baugé may also refer to:

Family name 
 Achille Maffre de Baugé, Occitan poet
 André Baugé, 20th century opera and operetta singer
 Grégory Baugé, cyclist

See also 
 Battle of Baugé, a 1421 battle
 Château de Baugé, a restored castle in Baugé
 Opéra de Baugé, an annual opera festival
 Bâgé-le-Châtel, commune in the Ain department in eastern France

French-language surnames